Willie Aames, also credited as Willie Ames (born Albert William Upton; July 15, 1960), is an American actor, film and television director, television producer, and screenwriter. He is best known for playing Tommy Bradford, one of the children of Tom Bradford (played by Dick Van Patten), on the 1970s television series Eight Is Enough, Buddy Lembeck on the 1980s sitcom Charles in Charge, and the title character in the direct-to-video series Bibleman (1995–2003).

Early life
Aames was born in Newport Beach, California, in 1960. He attended Edison High School in Huntington Beach, California, and was in both the choir and the Madrigal Ensemble.

Career
Aames began acting in the late 1960s as a child, appearing in shows such as Gunsmoke, The Wonderful World of Disney, Adam-12, and The Courtship of Eddie's Father. In 1971, he originated the role of Leonard Unger, the son of Felix Unger (Tony Randall), on the ABC-TV series The Odd Couple, a part that was later played by Leif Garrett. The following year, he voiced the character of Jamie Boyle in the animated series Wait Till Your Father Gets Home.

He guest-starred on various television series, including The Waltons. In 1974, he portrayed a 12-year-old Benjamin Franklin in the miniseries Benjamin Franklin. The next year, he co-starred in the series Swiss Family Robinson.

In 1977, he landed the role of Tommy Bradford in the comedy-drama Eight Is Enough. During this period, he played in a band called Willie Aames & Paradise, in which he was lead singer/guitarist. Formed while Aames was in junior high school, the group eventually landed a recording contract with CBS Custom Label. During this time, Aames appeared in his first movie role, Scavenger Hunt. After the series ended in 1981, Aames appeared in more film roles, including Zapped! opposite Scott Baio and Paradise with Phoebe Cates.

Before portraying the role of Buddy Lembeck in Charles in Charge in 1984, Aames played the character of Robbie Hamlin on the ABC soap opera The Edge of Night. From 1983 to 1985, he was the voice of Hank on the cartoon Dungeons & Dragons. After the end of Charles in Charge in 1990, Aames hosted the game show The Krypton Factor.

Aames starred as Bibleman in the direct-to-video Christian superhero series from 1995 to 2003, before leaving to spend more time with his family. He was replaced by Robert T. Schlipp.

In 2010, Aames's career changed direction when he began working as a Cruise Director for Regent Seven Seas Cruises. He subsequently worked for Oceania Cruises and Viking (Ocean) Cruises, before returning to acting in 2016.

Personal life
Aames has been married three times. Aames married Vicki Weatherman in 1979, having one child, Christopher. He married Maylo McCaslin in 1986, having one child, Harleigh Jean. Aames married Winnie Hung in 2014.

Aames has battled alcohol addiction in his life.

Filmography

References

External links

 

1960 births
20th-century American male actors
21st-century American male actors
American Christian clergy
American game show hosts
American male child actors
American male film actors
American male screenwriters
American male television actors
American male voice actors
American television directors
Film directors from California
Living people
Male actors from Huntington Beach, California
Participants in American reality television series
Screenwriters from California
Television producers from California